James Neamon Hutto (born October 17, 1947) is an American former professional baseball utility player in Major League Baseball (MLB), who played for the Philadelphia Phillies and the Baltimore Orioles.

Baseball career
Hutto was selected out of Pensacola High School in the 7th round (135th overall) of the 1965 June Amateur Baseball Draft by the Boston Red Sox. He was traded along with Grant Jackson and Sam Parrilla from the Phillies to the Orioles for Roger Freed on December 15, 1970.

References

External links

1947 births
Living people
Baltimore Orioles players
Baseball players from Norfolk, Virginia
Eugene Emeralds players
Florida Instructional League Cardinals players
Florida Instructional League Red Sox players
Major League Baseball outfielders
Minor league baseball managers
Philadelphia Phillies players
Rochester Red Wings players
Salt Lake City Angels players
Southern Miss Golden Eagles baseball players
Tiburones de La Guaira players
American expatriate baseball players in Venezuela
Tulsa Oilers (baseball) players
Waterloo Hawks (baseball) players
Winston-Salem Red Sox players